Lee Gwang-sun (born 1 April 1969) is a South Korean rower. She competed in the women's coxed four event at the 1988 Summer Olympics. She attended Kyonggi University.

References

1969 births
Living people
Kyonggi University alumni
South Korean female rowers
Olympic rowers of South Korea
Rowers at the 1988 Summer Olympics
Place of birth missing (living people)